Tarbert is a place name in Scotland and Ireland. Places named Tarbert are characterised by a narrow strip of land, or isthmus. This can be where two lochs nearly meet, or a causeway out to an island.

Etymology

All placenames that variously show up as tarbert, tarbat or tarbet in their anglicised form derive from either the Irish or Scottish Gaelic an tairbeart, commonly translated as "the isthmus" today.

Both these words derive from two Old Irish elements, tar "across" and a nominalised form of the verb ber "to carry". So the literal translation would be an "across-carrying". The reason for this is that all tarberts are in fact located at or near old portage sites.

In English language spellings the first syllable "tar" has generally remained constant but the second syllable "bert" has variously been spelled as "bart", "bert" "bat", "bad" etc.

Examples
Places named Tarbert include:

Scotland
 Tarbert, Gigha, on Gigha
 Tarbert, Jura, on Jura
 Tarbert, Kintyre the town at the northern end of the Kintyre peninsula, Argyll
 Tarbert, Harris, a ferry port in the Western Isles
 Tarbert, on Canna
 Tarbert, on Salen Bay, Highland
 Loch Tarbert, Jura, on the west coast of the island of Jura
 West Loch Tarbert, an inlet between North and South Harris
 East Loch Tarbert also by Harris in the Western Isles of Scotland
 West Loch Tarbert, Argyll in Argyll
 East Loch Tarbert, Argyll also in Argyll
 Glen Tarbert, between Loch Linnhe and Loch Sunart
 Tarbert Hill, above the town of West Kilbride
 Tarbert Bay, on the island of Canna
 Loch Tarbert, a sea loch on the island of Jura
 East Tarbert Bay and West Tarbert Bay on the Isle of Gigha
 East Tarbert Bay and West Tarbert Bay on the Mull of Galloway

Ireland
 Tarbert, County Kerry, a ferry port on the estuary of the River Shannon in County Kerry.
 Tarbert, County Laois, a townland in County Laois

Canada 
 Tarbert, Ontario

See also
 Tarbert (disambiguation)
 Tarbet (disambiguation)
 Tarbat
 Loch Torridon, the root of the name having a similar meaning to "tarbert"
 Eday, an Orkney island which has a name derived from the Old Norse eið, which also  means "isthmus".

References

Portages